Machuca is a 2004 internationally co-produced coming-of-age drama film co-written and directed by Andrés Wood. It stars Matías Quer, Ariel Mateluna, Manuela Martelli, and Aline Küppenheim alongside Federico Luppi.

Set in Santiago during the months leading up to the 1973 coup d'état led by General Augusto Pinochet  – which overthrew Salvador Allende's socialist government – the film tells the story of two boys who attend an upper-class elementary school: Gonzalo Infante – who belongs to a rich family with a European background – and Pedro Machuca – who is poor and comes from an indigenous background. They are classmates and become friends at this English-language Catholic elite school, which Machuca attends thanks to the social integration project developed by its director, Father McEnroe.

The film is inspired by and dedicated to Father Gerardo Whelan, C.S.C. who from 1969 to 1973 was the director of Colegio Saint George (Saint George's College), the private school depicted in the movie, which the director himself attended as a boy.

Machuca was filmed in July 2003 and produced on a moderate budget of US$1,700,000. It is a joint Chilean-Spanish-British-French international co-production with support from Ibermedia. Production companies included Andrés Wood Producciones, Tornasol Films, Mamoun Hassan, Paraíso, and Chile Films. The film premiered in the Directors' Fortnight parallel section of the 57th Cannes Film Festival in May 2004. It was well received in theaters in Chile and a few other countries, but did not have notable box office success outside of Latin America.

Plot
The story is told from the viewpoint of Gonzalo Infante, an 11-year-old upper-class boy, and it is set in a turbulent time in Chile. The working class was demanding social justice and significant changes to the country's socioeconomic structure after electing a socialist president. In this context, the wealthy classes became afraid of the socialist movement, and some of its most prominent members conspired against the government of Salvador Allende.

While Gonzalo's father is sympathetic to the less fortunate and not part of the right-wing movement, he wants to take his family to Italy, where he often travels for his work at the UN FAO. Gonzalo's mother, on the other hand, is resigned to the state of affairs and is having an affair with a wealthy and much older Argentinean.

Gonzalo attends a private school where the determined school principal, Father McEnroe, has initiated a social integration project. However, some of the parents consider it a "leftist venture" instead of a Christian, charitable effort. When five disadvantaged students are admitted to Gonzalo's class, he befriends Pedro because he sympathizes with him after some wealthy classmates bully him.

Gonzalo joins Pedro and his neighbor Silvana in selling flags and cigarettes during street demonstrations. They first sell nationalist flags at a right-wing protest and later socialist flags at a leftist rally supporting the government. Silvana initially calls Gonzalo a snob and "strawberry-face," but eventually, they develop affection for each other and even share a kiss.

Pedro visits Gonzalo's home and is amazed by the fact that Gonzalo has a room to himself, filled with toys and a closet full of clothes. However, he also witnesses the tension and cruelty that exists within Gonzalo's family. When Gonzalo visits Pedro's shantytown dwelling, he is horrified by the extremely poor living conditions. Their friendship mirrors that of the Lone Ranger and Native American Tonto from Gonzalo's favorite comic book series. Gonzalo realizes that their friendship is against all odds when Silvana discovers them reading an issue of the magazine and comments on the implausibility of a white person being friends with an Indian.

As the political unrest in Chile escalates, the boys' friendship is put to the test. Pedro's alcoholic father ridicules him, telling him that while his supposed friend will grow up to be wealthy, he will be stuck in the lower class, likely cleaning toilets for the rich. The affluent parents of the students at St. Patrick's school have differing views on Father McEnroe's project. While some support the new policies, including Gonzalo's father, many others, including Gonzalo's mother, believe that for the good of the country, social classes should not be mixed.

The school's vegetable garden, which the students take care of, turns out to be a failure, jeopardizing the funding for Father McEnroe's project. During an anti-Communist protest, Gonzalo's mother takes Silvana's merchandise when the latter is being threatened by other protesters. Silvana retaliates by spitting on Gonzalo's mother's car windshield and calling her a whore. This increases tension between Gonzalo and Pedro, leading to a fight and the end of their friendship.

Following the coup, Father McEnroe is removed from the school by the military and is not even allowed to perform mass at the chapel. When he attends the first mass performed by a new priest, he receives communion but does not swallow the sacramental bread to preserve it from desecration and declares the place profane. Pedro leads the other students in honoring the priest, resulting in his expulsion from the school.

Gonzalo visits the shantytown where Pedro and Silvana live, but upon arrival, he witnesses soldiers raiding the area and a tragic incident unfolds, resulting in Silvana being shot and killed. Gonzalo finds himself dragged into the chaos and struggles to convince the soldiers that he does not belong there until he shows them his nice clothing and fair complexion. Eventually, the soldier lets him go, warning him never to return.

Heartbroken over the events he witnessed and the loss of his friend, Gonzalo returns to his family's new home. Their wealth has increased thanks to his mother's lover and the new government's redistribution of wealth. However, Gonzalo is left devastated, recalling the last time he saw Pedro staring at the ruins of their homes.

Cast

Reception 
Ann Hornaday of The Washington Post deemed the film to be "that rare film that merges the personal and political without sacrificing restraint or intellectual honesty". 

Mike Goodridge of ScreenDaily described the film as a "small, artfully crafted movie", otherwise deeming it to be an "unsettling piece" which [unlike other films with similar themes] "doesn't fall into easy traps of sentimentalism".

Accolades 

|-
| align = "center" | 2004 || Vancouver International Film Festival || colspan = "2" | Most Popular International Film ||  || align = "center" | 
|-
| rowspan = "2" align = "center" | 2005 ||  || colspan = "2" | Best Spanish-Language Foreign Film ||  || align = "center" | 
|-
|  || colspan = "2" | Best Ibero-American Film ||  || align = "center" | 
|}

See also
 Cinema of Chile
 List of Spanish films of 2004

References

External links
 
 Machuca in Wood Producciones
 Kenneth Turan 2005. Youthful innocence sacrificed on the altar of politics
 Machuca in the Philadelphia Film Festival
 "Chilean movie recalls U.S. priest's presence amid turbulence of coup" 22 November 2005, www.georgiabulletin.org

2004 films
2000s Spanish-language films
Films about the Chilean military dictatorship
Films directed by Andrés Wood
Chilean drama films
Chilean coming-of-age films
Chilean historical films
Spanish coming-of-age drama films
British coming-of-age drama films
French coming-of-age drama films
2000s Spanish films
2000s British films
2000s French films
2000s coming-of-age drama films
Films set in Chile
Films set in 1973
Georges Delerue Award winners
2004 drama films
Films about coups d'état
Tornasol Films films